Éloizes is a former Acadian literary publication based in Moncton, published by the Association of Acadian Writers. The journal was published 32 times between 1980 and 2002.

Description
Founded by Pierre Berthiaume, Bernadette Landry, Dyane Léger, Henri-Dominique Paratte and Melvin Gallant, the journal is "one of the results of the cultural turmoil in Acadia"  and encouraged the emergence of multiple Acadian literary voices. It also encouraged exchange projects with other American francophone communities (Ontario and Louisiana).

References

1980 establishments in New Brunswick
2002 disestablishments in New Brunswick
Defunct literary magazines published in Canada
French-language literature in Canada
French-language magazines published in Canada
Magazines established in 1980
Magazines disestablished in 2002
Magazines published in New Brunswick
Mass media in Moncton